"Cirkusový kôň" is a song by Marika Gombitová, released on single by OPUS in 1980.

The composition was written by Ján Lauko and Kamil Peteraj, while released next year on album Môj malý príbeh (1981). B-side of the single featured "Deň letí", which was composed by Gombitová herself.

Official versions
 "Cirkusový kôň" - Studio version, 1980

Credits and personnel
 Marika Gombitová - lead vocal, music
 Ján Lauko - music
 Kamil Peteraj - lyrics
 OPUS Records - copyright

References

General

Specific

1980 songs
1980 singles
Marika Gombitová songs
Songs written by Kamil Peteraj
Slovak-language songs